Guri (also Romanized as Gūrī and Goori; also known as Gūreh and Gūrmī) is a village in Dulab Rural District, Shahab District, Qeshm County, Hormozgan Province, Iran. At the 2006 census, its population was 726, in 151 families.

References 

Populated places in Qeshm County